Pochepskoye is a rural locality (a selo) and the administrative center of Pochepskoye Rural Settlement, Liskinsky District, Voronezh Oblast, Russia. The population was 1,130 as of 2010. There are 12 streets.

Geography 
Pochepskoye is located 27 km north of Liski (the district's administrative centre) by road. Dmitriyevka is the nearest rural locality.

References 

Rural localities in Liskinsky District